Most is a city in the Ústí nad Labem Region of the Czech Republic. It has about 63,000 inhabitants.

Most is an industrial city with a long tradition of lignite mining. Due to mining, the historic city was demolished and replaced by a planned city. In locations where mining has ended, Most is an example of successful landscape revitalization.

Administrative parts
Most is made up of eight city parts and villages: Most, Starý Most, Čepirohy, Komořany, Rudolice, Souš, Velebudice and Vtelno.

Etymology
The name Most means "bridge" in Czech. The city was named after the system of bridges that crossed the swamps in this area in the 10th century. The German name for Most is Brüx (derived from the German word for "bridge", Brücke).

Geography

It lies on the border between the Most Basin and Central Bohemian Uplands. The Bílina River flows through the city.

There are several artificial lakes created during land rehabilitation after coal mining. It is mainly used for sports and recreation. The second notable lake in the centre of Most is Matylda Lake, also used for sports and recreation.

History

11th–15th centuries

The first written mention of Most is from 1040, when it was mentioned in Latin Chronica Boemorum as Gnevin Pons ("Hněvín Bridge"). From the end of the 12th century, the Hrabišic dynasty began to colonize the territory and established here a stronghold. Most was originally a market village at the crossroads of old trade routes. After 1210, the villages was moved to the other bank of the river Bílina.

In 1227 Kojata, the last Hrabišic, passed his property to the Zderaz Monastery, but King Wenceslaus I used the right of escheat and took Most from the monastery. Hněvín Castle was built on the site of the old stronghold in 1238–1248. After 1240, Most acquired the character of a town. It was first referred to as a town in 1247. In the mid-13th century, it was promoted to a royal city. King Ottokar II granted the city further privileges in 1273. The city developed rapidly and benefited from its advantageous location near the kingdom's borders and on an important road.

During the reign of next kings, the city continued to prosper. In 1321, 1334, 1395 and 1455, the city was damaged by fires. In 1374, Charles IV granted Most the vineyard right, wine has probably been produced here since the 12th century. In the mid-14th century, the city walls were finished. The prosperity ended with the Hussite Wars but in both 1421 and 1424 the city withstood the Hussite siege. Most recovered thanks to the trade route of international importance and thanks to the start of iron ore mining in the nearby Ore Mountains.

16th–17th centuries
In 1515, the worst fire in its history hit the city, damaging the church from 1253–1257 and the town hall. Construction of the new church began in 1517, and the new Renaissance city hall was built before 1553. In the second half of the 16th century, the crisis was deepened by crop failures, loans to the king, plague, famine, further fires and Turkish wars. Most went into debt and paid off the debts for the next hundred years. In 1595, the city bought the Hněvín Castle from Emperor Rudolf II and other estates.

In 1639–1648, during the Thirty Years' War, the city was occupied by Swedish troops because of the Hněvín Castle. After the Thirty Years' War, the city lost much of its economic and political significance. So that the castle would no longer be a reason to besiege the city, the inhabitants of Most asked Emperor Ferdinand III to demolish the castle. The demolition took place in 1651–1653.

18th–19th centuries
Huge reserves of coal were discovered in the 18th century. Most was affected by the Silesian Wars when the city had to pay war contributions. After the city's economic conditions were consolidated in the second half of the 18th century, Most was affected by the passage of Napoleon's army at the beginning of the 19th century. In the first half of the 19th century, the medieval wall were demolished. In 1820, Most was hit by another big fire.

At the beginning of the 19th century, mining of lignite was started. Industrialization began and the turning point was the construction of the railway in 1870, which brought connection with coal outlets. The last quarter of the 19th century saw a rapid increase in the number of inhabitants and newly built apartments, and there was an influx of the Czech population. A sugar factory, a porcelain factory, a steel factory, a brewery and a city museum were built.

20th century
In 1938, Most was annexed by Nazi Germany. Under German occupation from 1938 until 1945, the city under its Germanized name Brüx was administered as a part of the Regierungsbezirk Aussig of Reichsgau Sudetenland. In 1944, there was a subcamp of the Flossenbürg concentration camp providing forced labor in coal mines outside Most. The prisoners were mostly Poles. Most was repeatedly bombed during the Oil Campaign of World War II. The Germans also operated a Gestapo prison in the city.

After the war, Most was restored to Czechoslovakia. German population was expelled in accordance with the Potsdam Agreement and the city was resettled by Czechs.

In 1964, the Czechoslovak Communist government decided to demolish the historic Most due to the expansion of coal mining, including the Gothic city centre, the brewery founded in 1470, the 1910 theatre, and the cemetery established in 1853. Only the Church of the Assumption of the Virgin Mary was saved. The destruction of the historic town began in 1965 and was finished in 1985. Simultaneously with the start of mining, a new city began to emerge, with the first building finished in 1971. Newly built, standardized blocks of flats (paneláks) followed brutalist architecture common for that era. The destruction of Most brought monetary profit to the state as coal was mined in the locality for an estimated 3 billion CSK.

Demographics
Most has a significant Romani people community, concentrated especially in the Chanov housing estate.

Economy

Most lies on the edge of the Most Basin and is an important lignite-mining region. Since the discovery of huge reserves of coal, the city has been shaped by mining. It caused an influx of residents and the development of other industries, but it also caused the destruction of historic parts of the city. It still employs hundreds of people, the largest employer in the city is Czech Coal Group.

The Komořany power plant is linked to coal mining. It is a large lignite power plant with a total installed electrical output of 239 MWe, built in 1955–1958.

In addition to mining, heavy industry and chemistry were developed in Most, but in the 21st century they are replaced by services in the composition of the city's economy. The mining segment operates not only in the form of coal mining, but also in the framework of extensive land rehabilitation. The cultivation of wine and fruit was also restored. The recultivation of the landscape in the vicinity of Most is unique and appreciated as an effective and sensitive revitalization of the landscape, which is a model for further recultivations. The ouskirts of Most have become attractive for tourism.

Transport
Most is located on the railway lines Prague–Cheb, Kadaň–Děčín and Rakovník–Osek. In addition to the main railway station, the Most-Kopisty and Třebušice stops are also located in the municipal territory.

The city operates a transport company together with the neighbouring town of Litvínov. In addition to buses, there is also the Most–Litvínov tramway network.

Education
Three universities have detached workplaces in Most: Czech University of Life Sciences Prague, VSB – Technical University of Ostrava, and University of Finance and Administration.

Sport

The local football club FK Baník Most 1909 existed for more than 100 years and used to play in the top tier of Czech football, but it was disestablished in 2016. The city is now represented by FK Baník Most-Souš, playing in the 3rd–4th tiers of Czech football.

Most Hippodrome is located in the Velebudice part of Most. The city hosts eight horse racing days per year, and is thus one of the leading horse racing locations in the region. The area with the race track was created during the reclamation of the landscape and is also used for other sports and cultural events.

Most is known for Autodrom Most, a race track for motorsport opened in 1983.

Aquadrom Most is a water park located in the centre of Most.

Sights

Hněvín Castle belongs to the main landmarks of the city. After the original castle was demolished in 1651–1653, the current romantic castle was built as a copy of it. Its main part is a stone lookout tower, built in 1900.

The most important monument is the Gothic Church of the Assumption of the Virgin Mary. It was built in 1517–1602, after the old city church was destroyed by a huge fire in 1515. The Czechoslovak government took pride in the relocation of this religious structure, and the building was mentioned in the Golden Guinness Book Of World Records as the heaviest building ever moved on wheels.

The oldest preserved building in Most is the Church of the Holy Spirit. It was probably built in the 1320s and first documented in 1351. The church is small, but it is very valuable due to its preservation and pure Gothic style. After the move of the Church of the Assumption of the Virgin Mary, the churches found themselves next to each other. Today the Church of the Holy Spirit has been desecrated and exhibitions and classical music concerts take place in its premises.

In Vtelno is the Church of the Exaltation of the Holy Cross. It was built in the Baroque style in 1736–1738.

Among the other monuments are the building of the Regional Museum in Most, Neorenaissance fountain, plague column with the sculptural group of St. Anne, set of Stations of the Cross, and Jewish cemetery in Souš.

In popular culture
Most was nationwide popularized by successful TV series Most! (2018). It used to be a popular location for filming foreign war films. Several films were shot here, including The Bridge at Remagen (1969), Slaughterhouse-Five (1972), All Quiet on the Western Front (1979) and Battle of Moscow (1985), and Czech films The Joke (1969), Something Like Happiness (2005), Dolls (2007) and ROMing (2007).

Notable people

Andreas Hammerschmidt (ca. 1611–1675), composer
Florian Leopold Gassmann (1729–1774), composer
Rudolf Ritter (1878–1966), tenor
Wenzel Hablik (1881–1934), painter and architect
Raoul Schránil (1910–1998), actor
Heini Halberstam (1926–2014), mathematician
Judita Čeřovská (1929–2001), singer
Josef Masopust (1931–2015), football player and coach
Jan Mühlstein (born 1949), politician
Pavel Chaloupka (born 1959), football player
Vladimír Růžička (born 1963), ice hockey player
Libor Pimek (born 1963), tennis player
Petr Svoboda (born 1966), ice hockey player
Bedrich Benes (born 1967), computer scientist
Martin Ručínský (born 1971), ice hockey player
Jan Vopat (born 1973), ice hockey player
Petr Franěk (born 1975), ice hockey player
Vlastimil Kroupa (born 1975), ice hockey player
Petr Johana (born 1976), football player
Marek Židlický (born 1977), ice hockey player
Pavel Rosa (born 1977), ice hockey player
Kamil Piroš (born 1978), ice hockey player
Tomáš Divíšek (born 1979), ice hockey player
Markéta Jánská (born 1981), model
Tomáš Kůrka (born 1981), ice hockey player
Iveta Benešová (born 1983), tennis player
Lukáš Kašpar (born 1985), ice hockey player

Twin towns – sister cities

Most is twinned with:
 Marienberg, Germany
 Meppel, Netherlands
 Veszprém, Hungary

Gallery

References

External links

Official tourist portal

 
Populated places in Most District
Socialist planned cities
Cities and towns in the Czech Republic
Oil campaign of World War II
Mining communities in the Czech Republic